XBE may refer to:

Bearskin Lake Airport, the IATA airport code
 Xbox executable, executable file format for the Xbox game console
 Xenobiotic biotransforming enzymes, enzymes used in biotransformation processes